MC Cable is a cable television company  for the Principality of Monaco owned by Monaco Telecom. It offers 200 French and foreign TV and radio channels (Al Jazeera English, Monaco Info, Golf Channel, BFM TV, BBC World News, DW-TV, Rai Tre, Rai Italia, TMC Monte Carlo, Luxe.tv, TF1, CNN International, France 2, Fox News, MSNBC, Love Nature, France 3, and Russia Today are offered free of charge).

External links
  

Cable television companies
MC Cable
Mass media companies of Monaco